The Fortunes of Fifi is a 1917 American silent historical romance film directed by Robert G. Vignola and starring Marguerite Clark. Based on the novel of the same name by Molly Elliot Seawell, the film is set in France and takes place during the era of Napoleon Bonaparte. The film is now presumed lost.

Cast
 Marguerite Clark – Fifi
 William Sorelle – Cartouche
 John Sainpolis – Duvernet 
 Yvonne Chevalier – Julie
 Kate Lester – Madame Bourcet
 Jean Gauthier – Louis Bourcet
 J. K. Murray – The General

References

External links

 
 
The Fortunes of Fifi still photograph

1917 films
American romantic drama films
American silent feature films
American black-and-white films
Films based on American novels
Films directed by Robert G. Vignola
Films set in the 18th century
Lost American films
Paramount Pictures films
1917 romantic drama films
American historical romance films
1910s historical romance films
1910s American films
Silent romantic drama films
Silent American drama films
1910s English-language films
Silent historical romance films